Chal-e Mohammad Hoseyn-e Sofla (also Romanized as Chāl-e Moḩammad Ḩoseyn-e Soflá; also known as Chāh-e Moḩammad Ḩasan, Chāl-e Moḩammad Ḩasan, and Chāl-e Moḩammad Ḩoseyn) is a village in Rud Zard Rural District, in the Central District of Bagh-e Malek County, Khuzestan Province, Iran. At the 2006 census, its population was 100, in 21 families.

References 

Populated places in Bagh-e Malek County